Stronger is an album by Swedish singer Sanna Nielsen, released on April 16, 2008, and her first in English. It featured her single “Empty Room” which came 2nd at the Melodifestivalen 2008. The album debuted at #1 at the Swedish album chart.

Track listing
The album was released in April 2008 with 14 tracks, and bonus video clip of her single “Empty Room”. It includes a cover of Olivia Newton-John's "Magic" 

Note: Track 14 ends at 2:58 followed by silence until 6:45 and a hidden track “Paradise“ which is ended abruptly at 9:26 by Sanna saying, among other things (in Swedish): "Can't we take this for the next album instead?" – almost 3 years later it was included in its entirety on her album “I'm In Love”.

Review
AllMusic critic John Lucas reviewed the album positively, saying this is “Nielsen's first album in English, it is also clearly aimed at a younger market” and "There's no reason why several songs on this album couldn't take flight well beyond the confines of the Swedish pop scene given the right push. A veteran at just 23 years of age, Nielsen has finally emerged as a star with significant potential."

Charts

Weekly charts

Year-end charts

Certifications

References

External links

2008 albums
Sanna Nielsen albums